Somxay Keohanam (born 27 July 1998), is a Laotian footballer currently playing as a forward.

Career statistics

International

International goals
Scores and results list Laos' goal tally first.

References

1998 births
Living people
Laotian footballers
Laos international footballers
Association football forwards
Competitors at the 2019 Southeast Asian Games
People from Champasak province
Southeast Asian Games competitors for Laos